Coca-Cola C2 (also referred to as Coke C2, C2 Cola, or simply C2) was a cola-flavored beverage introduced by The Coca-Cola Company first in Japan, then later on June 7, 2004 in the United States (and shortly thereafter, Canada), in response to the low-carbohydrate diet trend. This Coke product was marketed as having half the carbohydrates, sugars and calories compared to standard Coca-Cola. It contained aspartame, acesulfame potassium, and sucralose in addition to the high fructose corn syrup typically found in cola beverages distributed in America.

Aside from the high fructose corn syrup, one 12-ounce can of Coca-Cola C2 contains 19 mg of aspartame, 4 mg of sucralose and 19 mg of acesulfame potassium. The packaging design differs from other Coke products in that the logos are printed in black. For marketing on radio and television, and movie theaters the Queen song "I Want to Break Free" was used. When it was first introduced, though, The Rolling Stones song "You Can't Always Get What You Want" was used.  Various NASCAR Cup Series drivers ran paint schemes in the 2004 Pepsi 400 race to promote the new drink.

American sales did not live up to early expectations mainly due to customer disinterest in a mid-calorie soda, and partly due to the success of Coca-Cola Zero, a zero-calorie version of Coca-Cola; however, Coca-Cola said the brand would remain in its lineup, even while Pepsi discontinued its equivalent product, Pepsi Edge, in late 2005, just one year after its introduction. Many store shelves completely replaced the product with Coca-Cola Zero due to display, shelving and storage limitations, and with the introduction of Coca-Cola Cherry Zero, the product disappeared from all store shelves where it had previously remained, and in 2013, it was replaced by Coca-Cola Life, which was marketed for using Stevia as opposed to artificial sweeteners.

See also
 New Coke
 List of defunct consumer brands

References

Diet drinks
Coca-Cola cola brands
Products introduced in 2004
Discontinued soft drinks
Products and services discontinued in 2007